Choorian may refer to:

 Choorian (film franchise), a Pakistani film franchise
 Choorian (1963 film), directed by Amin Malik
 Choorian (1998 film), directed by Syed Noo
 Chooriyan, a 2015 Indian Punjabi film starring Vinod Khanna